NKI Fjernundervisning is a Norwegian correspondence school, established in 1959. The school was formerly a part of NKI Norsk Kunnskaps-Institutt AS, but since 2007 is part of the company Anthon B Nilsen. The school is located at Nadderud in Bærum.

NKI offers postal and Internet studies in courses from upper secondary school, post-graduate studies and university college studies.

External links 
 Official site
 Nettskolen, NKI's portal for studying online

Schools in Norway
Companies based in Bærum
Education in Bærum
1959 establishments in Norway
Educational institutions established in 1959